Alisimitra is a genus of sea snails, marine gastropod mollusks, in the family Costellariidae, the ribbed miters.

Species
Species within the genus Alisimitra include:
 Alisimitra barazeri Fedosov, Herrmann & Bouchet, 2017
 Alisimitra deforgesi Fedosov, Herrmann & Bouchet, 2017
 Alisimitra fuscolineata (Herrmann & Salisbury, 2012)
 Alisimitra polynesiensis Herrmann & R. Salisbury, 2019
 Alisimitra samadiae Fedosov, Herrmann & Bouchet, 2017
 Alisimitra tehuaorum (Huang, 2015)

Distribution
This species occurs in the following locations;
 · New Caledonia
 · Papua New Guinea
 · Society Islands
 · South China Sea

References

External links
 Fedosov A.E., Puillandre N., Herrmann M., Dgebuadze P. & Bouchet P. (2017). Phylogeny, systematics, and evolution of the family Costellariidae (Gastropoda: Neogastropoda). Zoological Journal of the Linnean Society. 179(3): 541-626

 
Costellariidae
Gastropod genera